Nam Ji-sung (born 15 August 1993, in Busan) is a South Korean tennis player.

Nam has a career high ATP singles ranking of 236 achieved on 12 August 2019. He also has a career high ATP doubles ranking of 102 achieved on 3 February 2020.

Playing for South Korea in Davis Cup, Nam has a W/L record of 3–7.

Challenger and Futures/World Tennis Tour finals

Singles: 14 (5–9)

Doubles: 48 (23–25)

External links
 
 
 

1993 births
Living people
South Korean male tennis players
Sportspeople from Busan
Tennis players from Seoul
Tennis players at the 2014 Asian Games
Asian Games competitors for South Korea
Universiade medalists in tennis
Universiade gold medalists for South Korea
Universiade silver medalists for South Korea
Medalists at the 2015 Summer Universiade
21st-century South Korean people